MBAC may stand for:

 Harold Charles International Airport (ICAO: MBAC), Ambergris Cay, Turks and Caicos
 Margolis Brown Adaptors Company, an internationally touring physical theatre company
 Master Bowlers Association of Canada
 Medical and Biomedical Advisory Council
 Mission Bay Aquatic Center, a waterfront community center located in Mission Bay Park, San Diego
 Mohun Bagan Athletic Club
 Museum of Fine Arts (disambiguation), several art museums